Mirabela Dauer (Bucharest, 9 July 1947) is a Romanian female pop star who has been famous for muzică ușoară (easy listening) music of the 1980, 1990, 2000s.

In 2015 the artist was chosen by Walt Disney Pictures to provide the Romanian voice of a witch in the animated movie The Black Cauldron.

References

1947 births
Living people
Musicians from Bucharest